Au'uapaau Mulipola Aloitafua is a Samoan politician and Deputy Speaker of the Legislative Assembly of Samoa. He is a member of the FAST Party.

Aloitafua was educated at Avele College and worked at the Post Office and Polynesian Airlines before running a consultancy service for the Land and Titles Court. He was first elected to the Legislative Assembly of Samoa in the 2021 Samoan general election. On 22 May 2021 he was nominated by FAST as Deputy Speaker. On 24 May he was sworn in during an ad-hoc ceremony after being locked out of Parliament. The appointment was disputed by the caretaker government. On 23 July 2021 the Court of Appeal ruled that the swearing-in ceremony was constitutional and binding, and that FAST had been the government since 24 May.

Notes

References

|-

Living people
Members of the Legislative Assembly of Samoa
Faʻatuatua i le Atua Samoa ua Tasi politicians
Year of birth missing (living people)